This article derives the main properties of rotations in 3-dimensional space.

The three Euler rotations are one way to bring a rigid body to any desired orientation by sequentially making rotations about axis' fixed relative to the object.  However, this can also be achieved with one single rotation (Euler's rotation theorem). Using the concepts of linear algebra it is shown how this single 
rotation can be performed.

Mathematical formulation
Let  be a coordinate system fixed in the body that through a change in orientation  is brought to the new directions

Any vector

rotating with the body is then brought to the new direction

that is to say, this is a linear operator

The matrix of this operator relative to the coordinate system  is 

As 

or equivalently in matrix notation

the matrix is orthogonal and as a right-handed base vector system is reorientated into another right-handed system the determinant of this matrix has the value 1.

Rotation around an axis
The linear operator "rotation by angle  around the axis defined by " has the matrix representation

relative to this basevector system. This then means that a vector

is rotated to the vector

by the linear operator. The determinant of this matrix is

and the characteristic polynomial is

The case  is the trivial case of an identity operator. For the case  the characteristic polynomial is

so the rotation operator has the eigenvalues

The eigenspace corresponding to  consists of all vectors orthogonal to the rotation axis, namely all vectors

For all other values of  the matrix is not symmetric and as  there is only the eigenvalue  with the one-dimensional eigenspace of the vectors on the rotation axis:

The rotation matrix by angle  around a general axis of rotation  is given by Rodrigues' rotation formula.

Note that  satisfies  for all vectors .

The general case
The operator "rotation by angle  around a specified axis" discussed above is an orthogonal mapping and its matrix relative to any base vector system is therefore an orthogonal matrix. Furthermore its determinant has the value 1.

In fact, if a linear operator has the orthogonal matrix

This means for the 3-dimensional case that there exists a coordinate system  such that the matrix takes the form

As it is an orthogonal matrix these diagonal elements  are either 1 or −1. As the determinant is 1 these elements are either all 1 or one of the elements is 1 and the other two are −1. In the second case it has the form

if the basevectors are numbered such that the one with eigenvalue 1 has index 3.

If the matrix is asymmetric, the vector

where

is nonzero. This vector is an eigenvector with eigenvalue . Setting 

But the difference is that for  the vector 

is zero and of no use for finding the eigenspace of eigenvalue 1, and thence the rotation axis.

Defining  as  the matrix for the rotation operator is

Quaternions

This means that the first 3 components  components of a vector defined from

and that the fourth component is the scalar

As the angle  defined from the canonical form is in the interval 

one would normally have that .

The entities  are defined from the quaternions by

Using quaternions the matrix of the rotation operator is

Numerical example

The corresponding matrix relative to this base vector system is (see Euler angles#Matrix orientation)

and the quaternion is

The canonical form of this operator

The quaternion relative to this new system is then

References
 .

Linear algebra
Kinematics
Operator